Ernst Fraenkel, OBE, (1923 – 13 November 2014) was a British businessman who was chairman and joint president of the Wiener Library for the Study of the Holocaust and Genocide  (1990–2003).

References 

1923 births
2014 deaths
British Jews
British businesspeople
Officers of the Order of the British Empire
Wiener Library
People from Wrocław
German emigrants to the United Kingdom